was a Japanese ocean liner owned by Nippon Yusen Kaisha (NYK).  The ship was launched in 1930 by Mitsubishi Shipbuilding & Engineering Co. at Nagasaki, on the southern island of Kyūshū, Japan, entering service in 1930. The ship was named for the Yasukuni Shrine, a famous Shinto shrine dedicated to the war dead of Japan, located in Tokyo.

Background
The Yasukuni Maru and her sister ship Terukuni Maru were built for NYK's fortnightly scheduled high-speed European service, coming into operation from the autumn of 1930. Both ships were specially designed for tropical conditions, with state-of-the-art air conditioning and fresh air circulation systems, as their routing was south from Japan, through the Indian Ocean, Suez Canal and Mediterranean Sea. Both ships were initially designed for use with geared turbine engines for projected cruising speed of 18 knots. However, under increasing pressure from the Japanese government to use only equipment and technologies available domestically, the design was changed to use standard Mitsubishi-Sulzer marine diesel engines, which reduced cruising speed to 15 knots.

Yasukuni Maru provided accommodation for 121 first-class passengers and 68 second class passengers. There was also room for up to 60 third-class passengers. The ship and passengers were served by a crew of 177.

Civilian career
Yasukuni Maru departed Yokohama on her maiden voyage on 22 September 1930 for London, with ports of call in between at Yokkaichi, Osaka, Kobe, Moji, Shanghai, Hong Kong, Singapore, Penang, Colombo, Aden, Suez, Port Said, Marseilles, and Gibraltar. On her return to Yokohama, she substituted Naples for Marseilles and arrived back at Yokohama on 18 October 1930. Thereafter, she entered regular service with NYK, following the same routing.

On 23 June 1933, Yasukuni Maru rescued five crewmen from a sinking Chinese junk near Hong Kong.

On 5 April 1934, Yasukuni Maru responded to a distress call from the Imperial Japanese Navy training cruiser  at Port Said, Egypt, and took off several ill sailors including an appendicitis patient.

On 12 March 1935, when Yasukuni Maru docked at London, it was reported that a  silver ingot had been stolen from her treasury.

Yasukuni Maru carried the Japanese Olympic team back from Germany after the 1936 Berlin Olympics.

On 16 November 1937, Yasukuni Maru became the first ship on the Europe-Japan route to be equipped with a two-way ship-to-shore wireless telephone for passengers to make telephone calls.

On 2 October 1938, Yasukuni Maru transported an art mission consisting of 30 Takarasiennes from the Takarazuka Revue, together with 18 managers, orchestra members and support staff from Kobe to Naples for an art mission to Germany and Italy commemorating the first anniversary of the signing of the Anti-Comintern Pact.

In September – October 1939, at the request of the Foreign Ministry,  Yasukuni Maru evacuated 240 Japanese civilians, members of the diplomatic staff and some German nationals from Germany on the verge of World War II. She returned to Yokohama on 18 October and was requisitioned by the Imperial Japanese Navy on 25 October to 11 December for use as an auxiliary transport, and was briefly used to transport troops and war materials from Japan to China during the Second Sino-Japanese War. However, as the war situation stabilized, she was returned to NYK.

With the situation in Europe regarded as unsafe following the sinking of Terukuni Maru off the coast of Great Britain by a naval mine, Yasukuni Maru was rescheduled for use on NYK's route from Kobe to South America via Honolulu, Hilo, San Francisco and Los Angeles.

On 8 August 1940 Yasukuni Maru embarked 30 German pilots previously employed in Colombia for return to Germany.

Military career

On 29 October 1940, Yasukuni Maru was again requisitioned by the Imperial Japanese Navy, and was classified this time as an auxiliary submarine tender. She was taken to Kure Naval Arsenal, where her luxurious internal fittings were torn out, and she was repainted gunmetal grey. On 11 January 1941 she was assigned to the 1st Submarine Division of the IJN 6th Fleet. During the conversion, she was armed with six obsolete 152-mm/50 cal. (6-inch) guns in single mounts and two dual mount Type 93 13.2-mm machine guns and fitted with one 1110-mm and one 900-mm searchlight. During most of the remainder of 1941, Yasukuni Maru was based at Takao in Taiwan for patrols of Ryukyu Islands and the coast of China. However, at the time of the attack on Pearl Harbor, she was based at Kwajalein. On 20 December 1941, she was assigned to the 3rd Submarine Division, still with the IJN 6th Fleet.

Kwajalein was attacked on 1 February 1942 by aircraft from United States Navy Task Force 8, with Yasukuni Maru hit by one bomb in her aft turret and damage to her stern. She returned to Kure on 1 March for repairs lasting to 23 April. She returned to Kure again on 23 November for repairs and regular maintenance.

In early 1943, Yasukuni Maru was assigned to "Operation C", the reinforcement of the Japanese landing on New Guinea. Yasukuni Maru, with 1448 men and 11 tanks of the IJA 20th Infantry Division departed Pusan for Wewak on 8 January 1943 together with transports Hakozaki Maru and Aratama Maru  and the destroyer . The convoy successfully delivers to reinforcements to Rabaul and Wewak. On 4 February 1943, Yasukuni Maru took on troops and supplies of the IJA 41st Infantry Division at Tsingtao, China, disembarking the troops at Wewak at the end of the month, and returning to Kure in early March. She was based at Truk in April, and was part of another troop convoy to Balikpapan in May. In October, she was part of the convoyed evacuating surviving Japanese troops from Wewak to Palau, and returned to Japan at the end of December 1943.

On 24 January 1944, Yasukuni Maru was assigned to a troop convoy departing Tateyama, Chiba for Truk. Escorting destroyer  recovered only 43 survivors. She was struck from the navy list on 10 March 1944.

See also
 List of ocean liners

Notes

References
 Ponsonby-Fane, Richard Arthur Brabazon. (1935).  The Nomenclature of the N.Y.K. Fleet. Tokyo : Nippon Yusen Kaisha.  OCLC 27933596

External links

 Yasukuni Maru at Combined Fleet.com

1930 ships
Ships of the NYK Line
Steamships of Japan
Passenger ships of Japan
Ocean liners
Auxiliary ships of the Imperial Japanese Navy
Submarine tenders of the Imperial Japanese Navy
Ships sunk by American submarines
World War II shipwrecks in the Pacific Ocean
Maritime incidents in January 1944
Ships built by Mitsubishi Heavy Industries